William Hallam may refer to:
 William Hallam (bishop)
 William Hallam (theatre manager)
 William Hallam (trade unionist)